Giulio Tremonti (born 18 August 1947) is an Italian politician. He served in the government of Italy as Minister of Economy and Finance under Prime Minister Silvio Berlusconi from 1994 to 1995, from 2001 to 2004, from 2005 to 2006, and from 2008 to 2011.

Early life
Tremonti was born in Sondrio, Northern Lombardy, in a family of Venetian and Campanian ancestry (his father was from Lorenzago di Cadore, in the Province of Belluno, and his mother from Benevento). He is a full professor of law at the University of Pavia, Italy, and has been a visiting professor at the Institute of Comparative Law, Oxford. His particular fields of interest are fiscal and tributary law, as well as fiscal policies.

Political career
Tremonti was the man who facilitated the dialogue between billionaire entrepreneur/politician Silvio Berlusconi and Umberto Bossi, leader of the federalist Northern League and a friend of Tremonti's, leading to the formation of the center-right coalition House of Freedoms. Although a  member of Forza Italia, on many issues he is closer to the League. In particular, he is a staunch political and fiscal federalist, supporting a federal reform of the Italian political system and more autonomy for Lombardy and Veneto, where he has his core supporters.

He first ran for the Italian Parliament in 1987 with the Italian Socialist Party (PSI).

Minister of Finance
Elected for the first time in 1994 for the Pact for Italy, he switched his allegiance to center-right Forza Italia soon after the Parliament held session, and obtained the finances position in the first Berlusconi cabinet.

Tremonti again served as finance minister starting in 2001, when Berlusconi came back to power. He was compelled to resign on 3 July 2004, after internal disputes about the economic situation of the country within the House of Freedoms, particularly with conservative National Alliance. In late 2005 he was then reappointed to the same position for the third time after his substitute Domenico Siniscalco resigned until the end of the Berlusconi III Cabinet. At the 2008 general elections, Berlusconi came back to power with a large majority in the parliament and assigned Tremonti the Economics and Finances position. At the end of 2011, following some rumours Tremonti would close to leave Pdl and to adhere to the Northern League. On 5 September 2012 Tremonti announced that he was setting up his own political movement ahead of elections to be held by next spring, potentially syphoning support from Silvio Berlusconi's People of Freedom party.

During his time in office, Tremonti made the first and biggest across the board Income tax cuts in Italy by introducing a No-Tax-Area (2003) and reducing the top marginal tax rate (2005). He also made a significant reduction in the corporate tax rate (from 36% to 33%, then further down to 27.5%) and has abolished taxes on reinvested profits. He has also completely abolished all donation taxes, estate/inheritance taxes (2001), and property taxes on housing/real estate (2008) at the national level (property continues to be taxed at the local level). Nevertheless, after these measures, the OECD stated in its latest (2007) report on Italy that "tax rates are high compared to other countries". He has been the promoter of the Global Legal Standards.

From 2008 until 2009, Tremonti was a member of the High Level Taskforce on Innovative International Financing for Health Systems, co-chaired by Gordon Brown and Robert Zoellick.

Other activities
As an author, during his life, Tremonti has written mostly on taxation and international trade. He expressed how high taxes are a drag on growth and how fiscal federalism can create territorial taxation competition between regions that can reduce the burden on families and workers. He has also been a critic of China's dumping trade policy that causes delocalization of jobs from Europe to Asia. Nevertheless, he gave an important lecture at the Central Party School of the Chinese Communist Party in 2009.

He is currently a member of the Italy-USA Foundation, chairman of the Aspen Institute Italia and a frequent guest columnist on the Corriere della Sera.
As of September 2020, he is a member of the Italian Aspen Institute.

References

Books on economics and finances
La fiera delle tasse ("The Tax Fair", 1991)
Il federalismo fiscale ("Fiscal Federalism", 1994)
Il fantasma della povertà ("The Phantom of Poverty", 1995)
Le cento tasse degli italiani ("The Hundred Taxes of Italians", 1996, with G. Vitaletti)
Lo Stato criminogeno ("The crime-generating State", 1997)
Rischi fatali – L’Europa vecchia, la Cina, il mercatismo suicida: come reagire ("Fatal risks: Old Europe, China, the Suicidal Free Market Ideology: How to React", 2005)
La paura e la speranza - Europa : la crisi globale che si avvicina e la via per superarla ("Fear and hope - Europe: crisis approaching and the way to overcome it", 2008)

External links
University biography 
2001 Profile in Business Week
BBC Report on his resignation in 2004
Giulio Tremonti's Official Website

|-

|-

|-

|-

1947 births
Living people
People from Sondrio
Forza Italia politicians
Italian economists
Italian essayists
Italian male non-fiction writers
Italian Socialist Party politicians
Finance ministers of Italy
Male essayists
Deputy Prime Ministers of Italy
University of Pavia alumni